"Under Control" is a song by American pop rock band Parachute. It was released on May 17, 2009 as the second single from their debut studio album, Losing Sleep (2009). It debuted at #33 on the Adult Pop Songs chart as of December 25, 2009 and has peaked at #27.

About the song
In this song the protagonist is in love with a female friend. He's tired of suppressing his feelings and he's finally going to tell her how he feels. Grammy-winning producer John Shanks produced this song, along with the rest of the album. Parachute singer/songwriter Will Anderson told PopEntertainment.com how they hooked up with Shanks: "John had called our manager and heard our stuff. We were really excited that he had showed interest in it. We went up there and hit it off. He's an incredible producer – he's worked with everybody from Bon Jovi to Ashlee Simpson and everyone in between. He taught us a lot about the studio and how to record an album.

Music video
The music video was directed by Scott Speer and premiered on October 2, 2009. The video featured a new mix of the lead vocal. The new mix is already receiving mixed reviews from fans.

Charts

Weekly charts

References

2009 singles
Music videos directed by Scott Speer
Parachute (band) songs
2009 songs